The 2018 Fairfield Challenger was a professional tennis tournament played on hard courts. It was the fourth edition of the tournament which was part of the 2018 ATP Challenger Tour. It took place in Fairfield, California, United States between 8 and 14 October 2018.

Singles main-draw entrants

Seeds

 1 Rankings are as of October 1, 2018.

Other entrants
The following players received wildcards into the singles main draw:
  Collin Altamirano
  Axel Geller
  Alex Rybakov
  J. J. Wolf

The following player received entry into the singles main draw as a special exempt:
  Maxime Janvier

The following player received entry into the singles main draw as an alternate:
  Darian King

The following players received entry from the qualifying draw:
  Sebastian Fanselow
  Evan King
  Kevin King
  Tommy Paul

The following player received entry as a lucky loser:
  Mitchell Krueger

Champions

Singles

 Bjorn Fratangelo def.  Alex Bolt 6–4, 6–3.

Doubles

  Sanchai Ratiwatana /  Christopher Rungkat def.  Harri Heliövaara /  Henri Laaksonen 6–0, 7–6(11–9).

References

2018 ATP Challenger Tour
October 2018 sports events in the United States
Fairfield Challenger